The Cohos Trail is a hiking trail running  through northern New Hampshire in the United States, connecting the northern and southern ends of Coos County.  It begins at Notchland, near Crawford Notch State Park, and follows a series of trails to the hamlet of Fabyans, then over Cherry Mountain to the town of Jefferson, over Mount Waumbek, along the Kilkenny Ridge Trail to Stark, through Nash Stream Forest to Dixville Notch, and north to the Connecticut Lakes and finally the Canada–US border at the southern edge of Quebec. There it connects with the Sentier Frontalier's trail to Mount Megantic and Mount Gosford in Canada.

The final section of the trail was completed in 2011, 33 years after it was first proposed by Kim Nilsen, then a newspaper reporter, who became the trail's chief architect.

References 

 Nilsen, Kim Robert (2000). The Cohos Trail: The Guidebook to New Hampshire's Great Unknown.  North Hampton, NH: Nicolin Fields Publishing.  . (Mr. Nilson is founder of the Cohos Trail. There is also a 2006 edition of the book.)
 The Colebrook News & Sentinel, accessed 18 January 2007.
 New Hampshire Public TV: Windows to the Wild: Discovering the Cohos Trail
 Program description
 Photo gallery

External links 
 Cohos Trail Association website
 Journals and Photos from people hiking the Cohos Trail

Hiking trails in New Hampshire
Long-distance trails in the United States
Tourist attractions in Coös County, New Hampshire
Protected areas of Coös County, New Hampshire